Burghwallis is a civil parish in the metropolitan borough of Doncaster, South Yorkshire, England.  The parish contains ten listed buildings that are recorded in the National Heritage List for England.  Of these, one is listed at Grade I, the highest of the three grades, one is at Grade II*, the middle grade, and the others are at Grade II, the lowest grade.  The parish contains the village of Burghwallis and the surrounding area.  Most of the listed buildings are in the village, and consist of a church, the ruins of a cross and a gravestone in the churchyard, the former rectory, houses, a pinfold, and a war memorial, and outside the village are a well head and a mill building.


Key

Buildings

References

Citations

Sources

 

Lists of listed buildings in South Yorkshire
Buildings and structures in the Metropolitan Borough of Doncaster